Full Moon is a 1986 album by Irish singer/songwriter Paul Brady, his first live album.  It was recorded live at The Half Moon, Putney, London, UK on Friday 6 April 1984.

Track listing
"Hard Station"
"Not The Only One"
"Take Me Away"
"Busted Loose"
"Dance The Romance"
"Crazy Dreams"
"Helpless Heart"
"Steel Claw"

Personnel
Paul Brady - vocals, acoustic guitar
Ian Maidman - bass
Kenny Craddock - keyboards
Terry Williams - drums
Phil Palmer - guitars, vocals

References

External links
 Full Moon on  Amazon
 Description from Paul Brady's web site

Paul Brady albums
1986 live albums